"I Am the Best" is a song recorded by South Korean girl group 2NE1 for their self-titled second EP. It was written and produced entirely by the group's long-time collaborator Teddy Park and was released for digital download as the third single from the EP on June 24, 2011, under YG Entertainment. "I Am the Best" integrates a variety of musical genres such as electro house, electronic and hip hop, complete with instrumentations of synthesizers and middle eastern inspired rifts. An empowerment anthem, the lyrics revolve around the themes of self-confidence, dominance, and narcissism.

Music journalists applauded the musical styles of "I Am the Best" and 2NE1's performance, and considered it an iconic symbol of the genre's girl crush image—an industry-specific concept encompassing themes of ferocity and female empowerment. Recognized as an important work in the spread of the Korean wave around the world, it has appeared near the top on several critics K-pop bests lists. It was commercially successful in the group's native country, achieving the number one position on the Gaon Digital Chart and garnered more than 3.4 million digital downloads in 2011, and became the fourth best-selling single of the year in South Korea.

Seo Hyun-seung directed the accompanying music video for "I Am the Best", which incorporated elaborate sets, props, attire and hairstyles with unconventional aesthetics. In 2014, the song attracted renewed attention after appearing in a Microsoft Surface Pro 3 commercial campaign. It then entered the top 70 on the France SNEP singles chart and topped the Billboard World Digital Songs chart for the first time, making 2NE1 the first Korean group and the second Korean act overall to have done so. The song was subsequently released in the United States on December 10, 2014 by Capitol Records and became one of the few non-English songs to have received airplay on American radio stations.

Background and composition
On April 18, 2011, YG Entertainment announced plans for 2NE1 to release a new series of singles, starting with Bom's solo track "Don't Cry" on April 21 and leading up to a new mini-album. The group would promote a new single every three weeks, intending to promote all six songs on their upcoming second mini-album. They reunited for the mini-album's second single, "Lonely", on May 12 after the release of "Don't Cry". Both songs were commercially and critically successful. YG announced on June 15 that the third single, "I Am the Best", would be released on June 24; it would be a more intense song, with a quick tempo (combining electronic music and hip-hop) and would be familiar to the youth who are used to clubbing culture. The track was made available through various sites and showed an "opposite vibe" as compared to the two previously released singles. It was written and produced by YG Entertainment collaborator Teddy Park, who had worked on most of the group's past records. In Japan, the Japanese-language version of the song was first made available for download via Recochoku on July 20, 2011, and was later included in the Japanese edition of the EP (Nolza) on September 21 as part of the group's debut in the country.

The three-minute, 28-second song is composed in the key of C major with a tempo of 128 beats per minute. It has been described as a powerful, energetic, self-confident anthem similar to "Fire" (2009), 2NE1's debut single. "I Am the Best" incorporates a range of musical influences (electronic, electro house, hip-hop, African rhythms and reggae), synthesizers, Middle Eastern-inspired strings in the song's middle eight, and chants. Calling it "the gold standard of anthemic bangers about self-confidence", Brag reviewer L. Singh cited "CL’s free-flowing rap" and the song's "often bordering on jarring" electronic soundscape. A Rolling Stone article noted the song's ability to bridge cultures and genres, "gloriously weav[ing] a Middle Eastern synth line in the middle of a glossy electro-pop track." An empowerment anthem, its lyrics explore self-confidence, dominance and narcissism.

In 2021, CL revealed a snippet of an alternate version of the song that was recorded, featuring vocals from Canadian singer Justin Bieber.

Critical response
Music critics applauded the musical styles of "I Am the Best" and 2NE1's performance. While discussing the rise of the Korean wave in November 2011, James Brooks of Pitchfork highlighted the song and praised it's energy, calling it "show-stopping" and further noted 2NE1's "manic" and "larger-than-life" charisma. In The New York Times, Jon Caramanica wrote that the song was "a postcard from the moment" when K-pop, which had been bound by the sound of other countries', "was beginning to embrace excess as its own style." Caramanica called 2NE1 powerful influence in the industry, almost "ruthlessly modern", and believed that "'I Am the Best' encapsulated its "high-grade attitude." The song was the only K-pop work to be selected by Slant Magazine in their list of 25 Best Singles of 2011; the publication described the track as "a jaw-dropping, vibrant triumph of pure swagger and verve", and wrote that one of the year's best developments was the Western world discovering the "unmitigated joy of K-pop." Korean Music Awards selection committee member Seo Jeong-min highlighted the song's "powerful, sensuous, and addictive electronic sound", and asserted that it firmly establishes itself as one of the representative tracks of K-pop. 

In Spin magazine's June 2012 list of the 21 Greatest K-Pop Songs of All Time, "I Am the Best" ranked at number three, with Chuck Eddy writing that it "might've been the best single released on the planet in 2011". In October 2013, the Smithsonian Institution recognized "I Am the Best" as a key work in the spread of the Korean wave around the world with "The Boys" by Girls' Generation, "Gangnam Style" by Psy, and "Fantastic Baby" by Big Bang, among others. An editor from Vice magazine commented that the "timeless hit 'I Am The Best' scream[s] self confidence" with its empowering lyrics. In January 2017, Jeff Benjamin of Billboard picked the track as the number one single in the group's discography, writing that as "one of the most recognized K-pop songs in the world," the song speaks to 2NE1's legacy as a "bonafide, complete act", and commented that each member proves herself as an essential element of the "perfect-pop product" by turning into a superstar on her respective section.

Awards

"I Am the Best" was nominated for a number of awards, including Song of the Year at three 2011 awards ceremonies. It received the  Song of the Year award at the 2011 Mnet Asian Music Awards in Singapore in November of that year, making 2NE1 the first group to win that award twice (their first award was for "I Don't Care" in 2009). They received awards for Best New Artist and Best Dance & Electronic Song with "I Am the Best" at the 2012 MTV Video Music Awards Japan and the ninth Korean Music Awards, respectively, and the song reached the top spot on the music programs Inkigayo and Music Bank.

Commercial performance
"I Am the Best" was a commercial success in South Korea, entering the Gaon Digital Chart at number four for the week ending June 25, 2011. In only one day of tracking, the song received 632,923 streams and achieved 414,580 units in digital sales, and was ranked as the week's sixth best-selling song. The following week, "I Am the Best" rose three positions to the number one spot on the chart, becoming the group's fourth number one single. The song sold an additional 735,518 digital units and received 2,181,326 streams, ranking at number one on both the component download and streaming charts. In its third charting week, the song descended eight positions down to number nine, with Infinite Challenge collaboration track "I Cheated" by GG (Park Myung-soo & G-Dragon) feat. Bom occupying number one. By the end of 2011, the song accumulated a total of 3.47 million units in digital sales, and ranked as the fourth best-selling single of the year in South Korea. Factoring in digital sales, streams and background music downloads, "I Am the Best" was ranked as the seventh best performing song in the country overall on the year-end Gaon Digital Chart for 2011, with the EP's other singles "Lonely" and "Don't Cry" ranking at number four and five, respectively. Elsewhere, in Japan, the song was certified gold by the Recording Industry Association of Japan (RIAJ) for digital sales of over 100,000 units. However, it was met with rather lukewarm reception on the charts, peaking at number 37 on the RIAJ Digital Track Chart and number 53 on the Japan Hot 100.

In the United States, two years after its release, Billboard listed the song as the sixth best-selling K-pop song in 2013. The following year, Microsoft Corporation featured the track in their Surface Pro 3 commercial "Head to Head", which was broadcast from August 2014 onwards. As a result of increased exposure from the advertising campaign, the song reached number one in the United States on Billboards World Digital Songs chart. It was the first K-pop song to achieve the feat, and the fourth Korean song to do so overall; the first three were Psy's singles, "Gangnam Style" (2012), "Gentleman" (2013) and "Hangover" (2014). It sold 6,000 copies during the week ending October 10, 2014, according to Nielsen SoundScan, becoming the group's best sales week in the United States. As of October 2014, the song has held the distinction of being the fifth-longest-charting single on the World Digital Songs chart, tied with BTS' "Mic Drop" (2017). The song received airplay from radio stations in New York and Boston without officially being released to the airplay market, and attracted interest from some for being one of the few non-English songs to be played on American radios. In France, "I Am the Best" entered the SNEP singles chart at number 117 in the chart issue dated November 8, 2014. The following week, the song rose to number 61 where it peaked, and charted for four additional weeks in the country.

Music video

Background

The first preview of the music video for "I Am the Best"—the song's first 10 seconds sung by group leader CL—was released on June 19, 2011. The preview was posted on YG Life and YouTube along with the song's cover art. YG Entertainment said that it would release an additional 10-second snippet of the track each day until the release date of the single on June 24. After a three-day delay due to a scaling issue, the song's music video premiered on 2NE1's YouTube channel on June 27. It was directed by Seo Hyun-seung, who had previously directed the music videos for 2NE1's "Fire" (2009), "Try to Follow Me" (2010) and "Can't Nobody" (2010). The choreography practice video was uploaded to the group's channel on July 1. A Japanese version of the music video was additionally uploaded later that month and was included in the DVD of Nolza in September.

The music video has been called extraordinary, intense and eye-catching, featuring a range of elaborate sets and props such as pyramids, diamonds, and globe-shaped chairs. The group makes a number of fashion statements, incorporating silver and street style ensembles designed by Sophie Hulme, Gemma Slack, Cassette Playa and Gareth Pugh. The visual features CL sporting a wrestler (complete with a sparkling WWE championship belt), futuristic and punk-inspired attire, metal-studded leather pieces, and unconventional hairstyles; for example, CL's resembles a bull’s horn while Dara's resembles that of the Dragon Ball character Vegeta. They are seen ascending stairs during the third chorus while breaking platinum records with baseball bats, seemingly indicating the widening of boundaries of the genre. The final scene features the members with AK-47s, destroying the former pyramid with a new mirrored triangle subsequently emerging with "2NE1" reflecting in the light.

Reception
The music video attracted over two million views in the two days after its release and four million views by July 1, considered impressive for a Korean act at the time. It was one of YouTube's top 10 trending videos in several territories worldwide, including France, Hong Kong, Sweden, Taiwan, and Mexico. The video garnered positive reviews from commentators; in March 2012, Tom Breihan of Stereogum ranked it number one on their list of 20 Best K-pop Videos, writing that "the song is ridiculously catchy and propulsive, and everything about the videothe editing, the choreography, the sheer volume of what-the-fuck imageryworks to support it", and opined "it's the greatest music video ever made". In Billboards article "Top 5 Must-See Music Videos From the K-Pop Phenoms" marking the group's fifth anniversary, Jeff Benjamin commented that "throughout all the looks, styles and sound, none seem to define 2NE1 as much as 'I Am the Best.'" In 2019, Hyperallergic editor So Yun Um noted the video's use of "elegant minimalism to speak volumes," adding that the video's extensive wardrobe and "sparse, high-contrast black and white convey grandeur, class, and charisma — 2NE1’s indelible presence." The video exceeded 100 million total YouTube views on October 6, 2014, and made 2NE1 one of the few K-pop groups to have accomplished the feat. In September 2021, the video surpassed 300 million views, becoming the first by a female Korean artist released in the first half of the 2010s decade to have achieved the milestone.

Promotion and live performances
The group premiered "I Am the Best" on television with their first performance on Inkigayo on June 26, 2011, following up with their first performance on Show! Music Core on July 2. After the release of the choreography practice video, the group announced a dance contest for the song on July 8, where 2NE1 and their choreographers would choose the four best submissions to win exclusive concert tickets for their upcoming Nolza tour in Seoul, Adidas Originals merchandise, and 2NE1 stage attire. The winner was L.Y.N.T., a female dance troupe from Vietnam. In August, 2NE1 embarked on their Nolza tour—the group's first headlining tour—and included the song in its set list. The group performed "Lonely" and "I Am the Best" at the 2011 Mnet Asian Music Awards in Singapore on November 29, 2011, where they sported black outfits with gold and silver ornaments. Their stage reportedly had the ceremony's highest broadcast viewership rating, garnering an average audience share of 5.56 percent across multiple networks. The following month, they performed the song at the MTV Iggy Best New Band in the World Concert at Times Square's Best Buy Theater, and at the SBS Gayo Daejeon 2011. 

On June 23, 2012, 2NE1 performed the song along with "Scream" at the 2012 MTV Video Music Awards Japan in Tokyo. During the concerts of their New Evolution Global Tour, which they embarked on the following month, "I Am the Best" was used as the opening number. The group made a performance with the song at the K-Pop Collection in Okinawa on October 18, and at the SBS K-Pop Super Concert in California on November 10. For their 2014 All Or Nothing World Tour, the group sang the track while sitting astride motorbikes.

Following a year's hiatus on December 2, 2015, 2NE1 gave a surprise performance at the 2015 Mnet Asian Music Awards in Hong Kong. After CL's solo performance, the rest of the group unexpectedly appeared and reunited to perform "Fire" and "I Am the Best". Fuse TV named the reunion as one of the best performances of the year, and was only one of the two non-Western acts to have been mentioned by the media outlet. On February 25, 2018, CL co-headlined the 2018 Winter Olympics closing ceremony with Exo and performed parts of the song; her audience included South Korean president Moon Jae-in, First Lady Kim Jung-sook, and Ivanka Trump. At the games, figure skaters Kim Kyu-eun and Alex Kam featured the track in their routine for the figure skating exhibition gala. In July of that year, CL's stage at the closing ceremony was ranked the eighth-best Olympic live music performance of all time.

On April 16, 2022, 2NE1 reunited to perform the song as a surprise performance during 88rising's Head in the Clouds showcase at the Coachella Festival in Indio, California, marking the group's first performance in over six years since the 2015 Mnet Asian Music Awards.

In popular culture

"I Am the Best" has appeared in various television series in South Korea and abroad, including in the first episode of the 2018 drama series Something in the Rain (when Jung Hae-in's character watches Son Ye-jin's casually dancing to the song). It was featured in the season 10 of the American reality series So You Think You Can Dance, when Jenna Johnson dances with Mark Kanemura in a routine choreographed by Kanemura. In March 2017, the song was used in The Magicians episode "Plan B", where one of the magicians (played by Hale Appleman) set off one of his magical objects to induce his targets into a dance trance. In 2019, it was heard in episode 5 of the drama Welcome 2 Life (with Rain's character referencing the song's title) and in the South Park episode "Board Girls". The following year, it was used in the drama Mr. Queen and in a dance performance of the Netflix original film Work It. 

About choosing "I Am the Best" for its "Head to Head" Surface Pro 3 commercial, Microsoft said that the song's "confident lyrics and lively beats made a good fit with the new product's image". A follow-up commercial, "Accolades", was broadcast beginning in December 2014. The song was also chosen for an advertisement campaign for the 2019 Kia Forte in North America. It was included in the Xbox 360 Kinect game Dance Central 3 (2012), the video-game series' first K-pop song, and was added to the soundtrack of Ubisoft's Just Dance 2020 rhythm game. In 2020, the lyrics of "I Am the Best" were featured in an exhibition titled "Korean Pop Lyrics: Melodies of Life" at the National Hangeul Museum in Seoul.

Legacy 
Considered to be 2NE1's signature song, the track is regarded as an important contribution in the international expansion of K-pop as well as a symbol of girl crush. Writing for Billboard, Caitlin Kelley defined girl crush as "anything that conveys the image of ferocity, stepping outside the expectations of hyperfemininity", but also amounting to "more abstract ideas of relatability, aspiration and female empowerment." She noted 2NE1 as one of the groups which largely developed the image in the genre, and referred to "I Am the Best" as "one of the most iconic girl crush concepts on many levels." In 2018, Pitchfork included the song in their article of 45 highlights in girl group history. In 2019, British GQ called it the highlight of 2011 and a game-changer in a decade of K-pop, acknowledging 2NE1 as one of the groups who brought the genre to the "curious attention of the Western fashion and music media", and regarded "I Am the Best" as the "visual blueprint" for the genre's "feisty" girl crush concept. Billboard ranked the song number four on their "100 Greatest K-pop Songs of the 2010s" list, calling the song "undeniably iconic" and the "track that bulldozed into our lives and pulled so many of us into the wondrous world of Korean pop".  

Regarding its international exposure, Jeff Benjamin of Billboard wrote that "K-pop has much of its overseas travel to thank for this absolute monster of a pop smash." GQ named it one of 24 songs that defined the decade worldwide while Stereogum named its video the second best music video of the 2010s, the only non-Western work to be mentioned in both lists. In 2021, Billboard editor Nolan Feeney wrote that "I Am the Best" "lives up to its name a decade later", and considered it to have helped pave the way for K-pop's takeover in America. In a ranking conducted by a panel of 35 music and industry experts curated by Melon and Seoul Shinmun from August of that year, it was listed as the seventh best Korean idol song of all-time, with critic Kim Young-dae writing that it presented a "completely new attitude and possibility" to the music of K-pop girl groups. He added that the 10-second opening sung by CL "will be remembered as a critical moment in K-pop history", along with the intro to "Gangnam Style" to be released the following year.

Credits
Credits adapted from Tidal.
2NE1vocals
Teddy Parklyricist, composer, producer
Lee Kyung-joon engineer
Jason Robertmixer

Charts

Weekly charts

Year-end charts

Sales and certifications

Release history

See also
 List of best-selling singles in South Korea
 List of Gaon Digital Chart number ones of 2011

References

External links
 

2NE1 songs
2011 singles
Korean-language songs
YG Entertainment singles
Songs written by Teddy Park
Gaon Digital Chart number-one singles
Songs with feminist themes
Capitol Records singles